The American Legislative Exchange Council, otherwise known by the acronym ALEC, is a non-profit 501(c) political organization established in 1975. The legislative members are state and federal legislators. It is a forum to allow the members to write model laws and discuss legislative language with other members. ALEC meetings are an opportunity for the corporate and non-profit leaders to meet and provide feedback to legislators. Member legislators can then use the model bills as templates for their own bills.

Members here are listed as former members by virtue of the end of their terms in office of the various state legislatures, a necessary qualifier for membership in ALEC.  None of these former members resigned from ALEC.  See Resigned legislative members for the individuals who have announced they are no longer members by choice.

ALEC keeps its membership, activities and communications confidential. This list includes former members whose identity primarily has become known through internal documents revealed to Common Cause and by research by members of the press.

Notable former legislative members
Early members included a number of state and local politicians who went on to statewide or national office, including Bob Kasten and Tommy Thompson of Wisconsin, John Engler of Michigan, Terry Branstad of Iowa, and John Kasich of Ohio. Several members of Congress were also involved in the organization during its early years, including Sen. James L. Buckley and Rep. Jack Kemp of New York, Sen. Jesse Helms of North Carolina, and Rep. Phil Crane of Illinois. More recently, Eric Cantor Majority Leader of the U.S. House of Representatives was an alumnus.

Former elected government official members

Former state level members
 Arizona
 Kirk Adams, R, former Speaker, House of Representatives, 2012 candidate for U.S. House of Representatives
 Connecticut
 William Hamzy, R, former Deputy Minority Leader, House of Representatives 
MARYLAND
Phillip D Bissett, R Maryland House of Delegates
James M Harkins, R Maryland House of Delegates
 North Carolina
 Harold Brubaker, R, North Carolina General Assembly
 Fred F. Steen, II, R, North Carolina General Assembly
 Utah
 Dan Liljenquist, R, resigned from State Senate to run for the U.S. Senate against Orrin Hatch
 Virginia
 Beverly Sherwood, R, House of Delegates
 Washington
 Michael Carrell, R, House of Representatives, former, died May 29, 2013
 Wisconsin
 Joe Knilans, R, State Assembly
 Scott Suder, R, Minority Leader, State Assembly
 Bill Kramer, R, Wisconsin State Assembly
 Neal Kedzie, R, Wisconsin State Senate
 Mike Ellis, R, President of the Wisconsin State Senate
 Joe Leibham, R, President Pro Tempore Wisconsin State Senate

Former members elected to the U.S. House of Representatives
 Alabama
 Spencer Bachus, R
 Mike D. Rogers, R
 Alaska
 Don Young, R
 Arizona
 David Schweikert, R
 California
 John Campbell, R
 Jeff Denham, R
 Jerry Lewis, R
 Tom McClintock, R
 Edward Royce, R
 Colorado
 Cory Gardner, R
 Doug Lamborn, R
 Ed Perlmutter, D
 Scott Tipton, R
 Florida
 Sandy Adams, R
 Allen Boyd, D
 Ginny Brown-Waite, R
 Mario Díaz-Balart, R
 Suzanne Kosmas, D
 Kendrick Meek, D  (also, unsuccessful candidate in the 2010 United States Senate election)
 John Mica, R
 Jeff Miller, R
 Bill Posey, R
 Adam Putnam, R (also, Florida Commissioner of Agriculture)
 David Rivera, R
 Ileana Ros-Lehtinen, R
 Dennis Ross, R
 Marco Rubio, R (also, United States Senate)
 Steve Southerland, R
 Daniel Webster, R
 Georgia
 Phil Gingrey, R
 Tom Graves, R
 Jack Kingston, R
 Tom Price, R (former Chairman, House Republican Policy Committee)
 Austin Scott, R
 Lynn Westmoreland, R
 Idaho
 Mike Simpson, R
 Illinois
 Phil Crane, R (also, 1980 candidate for President of the United States)
 Henry Hyde, R ALEC Founder (now deceased)
 Indiana
 Dan Burton, R
 Marlin Stutzman, R
 Iowa
 Leonard Boswell, D
 Steve King, R
 Kansas
 Lynn Jenkins, R
 Todd Tiahrt, R
 Kevin Yoder, R
 Kentucky
 Brett Guthrie, R
 Louisiana
 Rodney Alexander, R
 Maryland
 Andy Harris, R
 Michigan
 Dave Camp, R
 Mike J. Rogers, R
 Minnesota
 Erik Paulsen, R
 Mississippi
 Alan Nunnelee, R
 Steven Palazzo, R
 Missouri
 Sam Graves, R
 Vicky Hartzler, R
 Dave Hinson, R (also, Missouri House of Representatives)
 Blaine Luetkemeyer, R
 New Jersey
 Rodney Frelinghuysen, R
 Scott Garrett, R
 Frank LoBiondo, R
 New York
 John M. McHugh, R (also, former United States Secretary of the Army)
 Jack Kemp, R (also, former United States Secretary of Housing and Urban Development, 1988 candidate for President of the United States and 1996 Republican Nominee for Vice President running with Bob Dole, now deceased)
 North Carolina
 Howard Coble, R
 Walter Jones, R
 North Dakota
 Rick Berg, R
 Ohio
 Steve Austria, R
 Bob Gibbs, R
 Jim Jordan, R
 Robert Latta, R
 Jean Schmidt, R
 Steve Stivers, R
 Pat Tiberi, R
 Oklahoma
 Dan Boren, D
 Tom Cole, R
 Frank Lucas, R
 John Sullivan, R
 Oregon
 Kurt Schrader, D
 Pennsylvania
 Charlie Dent, R
 Michael Fitzpatrick, R
 James Gerlach, R
 Joseph Pitts, R
 Todd Platts, R
 South Carolina
 Jeff Duncan, R
 Tim Scott, R
 Joe Wilson, R
 South Dakota
 Kristi Noem, R
 Tennessee
 Diane Black, R
 Marsha Blackburn, R
 Texas
 Kevin Brady, R
 John Culberson, R
 Sam Johnson, R
 Kenny Marchant, R
 Virginia
 Eric Cantor, R (also, former Majority leader)
 Randy Forbes, R
 Morgan Griffith, R
 Washington
 Doc Hastings, R
 Jaime Herrera Beutler, R
 Cathy McMorris Rodgers, R
 Wisconsin
 Glenn Grothman, R (also, Wisconsin State Senate)
 Mark Pocan, D (also, former Wisconsin State Assembly)

Former members elected to the U.S. Senate
 Alabama
 Richard Shelby, R
 Florida
 Marco Rubio, R
 Idaho
 Jim Risch, R
 Kansas
 Jerry Moran, R
 Mississippi
 Roger Wicker, R
 Nebraska
 Deb Fischer, R
 Mike Johanns, R
 Nevada
 Paul Laxalt, R (also, former Governor, Lt. Governor, and 1988 candidate for President of the United States)
 North Carolina
 Jesse Helms, R (5 terms, now deceased)
 Oklahoma
 James Inhofe, R
 South Carolina
 Lindsey Graham, R
 West Virginia
 Joe Manchin, D
 Wyoming
 Michael Enzi, R

Former members elected Governor
 Arizona
 Jan Brewer, R, Governor
 Colorado
 Bill Owens, R, former Governor
 Indiana
 Mitch Daniels, R, Governor
 Iowa
 Terry Branstad, R, Governor
 Michigan
 John Engler, R, former Governor
 Ohio
 John Kasich, R, Governor
 Oklahoma
 Mary Fallin, R, Governor
 Frank Keating, R, former Governor
 Pennsylvania
 Tom Ridge, R, former Governor, resigned to become Secretary of Homeland Security
 South Carolina
 Nikki Haley, R, Governor
 Utah
 Gary Herbert, R, Governor
 Wisconsin
 Tommy Thompson, R, Governor
 Scott Walker, R, Governor

Resigned legislative members
 Alma Allen (politician), D, Texas House of Representatives
 Lisa Boscola, D, Pennsylvania Senate
 Mike Colona, D, Minority Whip Missouri House of Representatives
 Danielle Conrad, D, Nebraska Legislature
 Greg Cromer, R, Louisiana House of Representatives
 Dawnna Dukes, D, Texas House of Representatives
 Harold Dutton, D, Texas House of Representatives
 Walter Felag, D, Rhode Island Senate
 Mary Flowers, D, Illinois House of Representatives
 Ken Haar, D, Nebraska Legislature
 Ted Harhai, D, Pennsylvania House of Representatives
 Denise Harper-Angel, D, Kentucky Senate
 Brian Hatfield, D, Washington Senate
 Eric Johnson, D, Texas House of Representatives
 Ray Jones, D, Kentucky Senate
 William Keller, R, Pennsylvania House of Representatives
 Troy Kelley, D, Washington House of Representatives, once attended a meeting but claims he is no longer a member
 Tracy King, D, Texas House of Representatives
 Nick Kotik, D, Pennsylvania House of Representatives
 Joseph Markosek, D, Pennsylvania House of Representatives
 Armando Martinez, D, Texas House of Representatives
 Ruth Jones McClendon, D, Texas House of Representatives
 Heath Mello, D, Nebraska Legislature
 Jose Menendez, D, Texas House of Representatives
 George Muñoz, D, New Mexico Senate
 Jeremy Nordquist, D, Nebraska Legislature
 Nan Orrock, D, Georgia Senate
 Joseph Petrarca, D, Pennsylvania House of Representatives
 Brandon Phelps, D, Illinois House of Representatives
 Chente Quintanilla, D, Texas House of Representatives
 Brian Quirk, D, Iowa House of Representatives
 Harry Readshaw, D, Pennsylvania House of Representatives claims he didn't know he was a member
 Eddie Rodriguez, D, Texas House of Representatives
 Jennifer Seelig, D, Utah State House of Representatives
 Tim Shaughnessy, D, Kentucky Senate
 Kathy Stein, D, Kentucky Senate
 John Tassoni Jr, D, Rhode Island Senate
 Robert Theberge, D, New Hampshire House of Representatives
 Kevin Van De Wege, D, Washington House of Representatives
 Don Vaughan, D, Minority leader North Carolina Senate
 Ted Vick, D, South Carolina House of Representatives
 Hubert Vo, D, Texas House of Representatives
 Leanna Washington, D, Pennsylvania Senate
 Anthony Williams, D, Pennsylvania Senate

Former corporate members
 Amazon.com
 American Traffic Solutions resigned April 13, 2012
 Amgen
 Arizona Public Service Company
 Best Buy
 Bill and Melinda Gates Foundation
 Blue Cross Blue Shield
 Cargill is listed as a member in 1998, but now denies ever having been a member
 Coca-Cola
 Comcast
 CVS Caremark
 Dell
 Enron (went bankrupt in 2001, see Enron scandal)
 Facebook
 General Motors
 Google
 Hewlett-Packard
 John Deere
 Johnson & Johnson
 Intuit
 Kaplan, Inc.
 Kraft Foods
 Louis Dreyfus Group
 Lumina Foundation for Education
 Mars
 McDonald's
 Medtronic
 Merck
 Microsoft
 MillerCoors
 National Association of Charter School Authorizers
 National Association of Water Companies
 National Board for Professional Teaching Standards
 PepsiCo
 Procter & Gamble
 Reed Elsevier
 Royal Dutch Shell
 SAP
 Scantron
 TicketMaster was a member as late as 2000; it later denied membership and threatened legal action if it was listed again
 Walgreens
 Walmart suspended membership May 31, 2012
 Wendy's
 Yelp
 Yahoo!

See also
 List of members of the American Legislative Exchange Council

References

External links
 ALEC official website
 ALEC Corporations at SourceWatch

Political organizations based in the United States
Government-related professional associations in the United States
Conservatism-related lists